Trappea is a genus of  truffle-like fungi in the Trappeaceae family. Species of Trappea have been found in China, Europe, and North America.

The genus was circumscribed by Michael A. Castellano in Mycotaxon vol.38 on page 2 in 1990.

The genus name of Trappea is in honour of James Martin Trappe (born 1931) is an American mycologist and expert in the field of North American truffle species.

Species
As accepted by Species Fungorum;
 Trappea cinnamomea 
 Trappea darkeri 

Former species;
 T. darkeri var. lazzarii  = Trappea darkeri
 T. phillipsii  = Phallogaster phillipsii, Phallogastraceae
 T. pinyonensis  = Phallogaster pinyonensis, Phallogastraceae

References

External links

Hysterangiales
Agaricomycetes genera